Marziano Perosi (October 20, 1875 in Tortona – February 21, 1959 in Rome), brother of Don Lorenzo Perosi and of Cardinal Carlo Perosi. Italian composer, choirmaster, and organist.  He was an organist and choirmaster at the Santuario della Madonna del Rosario in Pompei, assistant to his brother Lorenzo at the Sistine Chapel, and organist and choirmaster of the Duomo of Milan. His most significant composition was the opera Pompei.

1875 births
1959 deaths
People from Tortona
Italian composers
Italian male composers
Italian classical organists
Male classical organists